BAP Pisagua (SS-33) is one of two Type 209/1200 submarines ordered by the Peruvian Navy on 21 March 1977. It was built by the German shipbuilder Howaldtswerke Deutsche Werft AG at its shipyard in Kiel. It is named after the battle of Pisagua which took place between Chilean warships and Peruvian coastal artillery on 2 November 1879. While undergoing sea trials in the North Sea, it collided with a Soviet ship on 8 April 1982 and suffered damage which delayed its commissioning. It eventually arrived to its homeport of Callao in 1983.

Sources
Baker III, Arthur D., The Naval Institute Guide to Combat Fleets of the World 2002-2003. Naval Institute Press, 2002.
Ortiz Sotelo, Jorge, Apuntes para la historia de los submarinos peruanos. Biblioteca Nacional, 2001.

1980 ships
Type 209 submarines of the Peruvian Navy
Ships built in Kiel